Paul James Miller (born 15 November 1978 in Darwin, Northern Territory) is a boxer from Australia, who represented his native country at the 2000 Summer Olympics in Sydney in the Men's 75 kg Division. There he was beaten by Vugar Alekperov of Azerbaijan in the second round, after defeating Dominica's Jerson Ravelo. He was an Australian Institute of Sport scholarship holder.

Olympic results 

Defeated Jerson Ravelo (Dominican Republic) 8–7
Lost to Vugar Alakparov (Azerbaijan) 8–9

Personal
His sister Gail Miller was a gold medalist at the 2000 Olympic Games (water polo).

References

External links

sports-reference

1978 births
Living people
Boxers at the 2000 Summer Olympics
Boxers at the 2002 Commonwealth Games
Olympic boxers of Australia
Commonwealth Games gold medallists for Australia
Australian Institute of Sport boxers
Sportspeople from Darwin, Northern Territory
Australian male boxers
Commonwealth Games medallists in boxing
Middleweight boxers
Medallists at the 2002 Commonwealth Games